Saskia de Jonge (born 22 November 1986 in Scheerwolde) is a Dutch swimmer who specializes in freestyle distances of up to 200 m and is part of the Dutch national team. She is currently training in Amsterdam under the guidance of Martin Truijens together with Olympic Champions Femke Heemskerk and Manon van Rooijen.

Swimming career
De Jonge made her international debut in Helsinki at the European Short Course Swimming Championships 2006. She won a silver medal in the 4×50 m freestyle relay alongside Inge Dekker, Chantal Groot and Marleen Veldhuis. Individually, she ended up 22nd in the 50 m freestyle and 18th in the 100 m freestyle. At the European Short Course Swimming Championships 2007 in Debrecen, she only swam in the heats of both relays.

2008
In March 2008, during the 2008 European Aquatics Championships in Eindhoven of her home country, she swam time-trials for the 2008 Summer Olympics. De Jonge qualified herself for the 4 × 100 m and 4 × 200 m freestyle relay. One month later she took part at  2008 FINA Short Course World Championships in Manchester, United Kingdom, where she swam in the heats of the 4×100 m freestyle relay in which she became world champion, although later on she was replaced for the final. She also started in the heats of the 4 × 100 m medley relay and helped the Dutch to achieve the final spot. In this final she was replaced and did not swim, but her teammates finished fourth. Individually she started in the 200 m freestyle and ended up 18th.

2008 Summer Olympics
De Jonge was selected for the 2008 Summer Olympics in Beijing in which she formed a team with swimmers Inge Dekker, Chantal Groot, Femke Heemskerk, Linda Bank, Ranomi Kromowidjojo, Manon van Rooijen, Hinkelien Schreuder, Jolijn van Valkengoed and Marleen Veldhuis. She did not qualify for an individual event, but was eligible to swim for the team in the three relay events (4 × 100 m freestyle, 4 × 200 m freestyle, 4 × 100 m medley). She was not chosen to swim in the 4 × 100 m freestyle, but did swim in the series for the 4 × 200 m freestyle, finishing fifth and being eliminated. She saw her teammates win the gold medal at the 4 × 100 m freestyle.

Personal bests

References

External links
 
  

1986 births
Living people
Dutch female freestyle swimmers
Olympic swimmers of the Netherlands
Swimmers at the 2008 Summer Olympics
People from Steenwijkerland
Sportspeople from Overijssel
21st-century Dutch women